The Circuit is an Australian television drama series, starring Aaron Pedersen and Gary Sweet. The first season aired in 2007 and the second in December 2009 to January 2010.

Plot
The series centres on Aboriginal solicitor Drew Ellis, who joins the district to work at the Kimberley Circuit Court.

Cast
 Aaron Pedersen as Drew Ellis
 Gary Sweet as Magistrate Peter Lockhart
 Kelton Pell as Sam Wallan
 Tammy Clarkson as Bella Noble
 Marta Kaczmarek as Ellie Zdybicka
 Nick Simpson-Deeks as Archie McMahon
 Leroy Parsons as Clarence Long
 Bill McCluskey as Sergeant Bob Temple
 Costa Ronin as Karl

Release
Season 2 aired from 1 December 2009 through 5 January 2010, ending the series.

Production
Filmed mainly in Broome, Western Australia and surrounding areas, the show had a budget of more than $4 million, and 1,000 local Aboriginal extras were employed for the production.

Series overview

Episodes 

Episode information was retrieved from Australian Television Information Archive and IMDb.

Season 1 (2007)

Season 2 (2009-10)

Awards
The show and cast won and were nominated in several categories at the 2007 AFI Awards, including:
Winner: Best Guest or Supporting Actor in a Television Drama – David Ngoombujarra
Nominated: Best Telefeature or Mini Series 
Nominated: Best Direction in Television – Richard Frankland (for episode 'Home Is Where the Past Is')
Nominated: Best Screenplay in Television – Kelly Lefever (for episode 'Home Is Where the Past Is') 
Nominated: Best Lead Actress – Tammy Clarkson

It also won the following awards:
 2007: Television Award, 2007 Human Rights Awards, Australia
 2008: Graham Kennedy Award for Most Outstanding New Talent at the Logies – Tammy Clarkson
 2009: AWGIE Award for Best Television Mini Series Original (for Season 2)
 2010: Silver Hugo, Mini Series (for Season 1), Chicago International Film Festival, U.S.
 2010: Silver Hugo, Best Television Series, Chicago International Film Festival, U.S.
 2010: Silver Hugo, Mini Series (for Season 2), Chicago International Film Festival, U.S.
2010: Australian Directors' Guild Awards  Best Direction in Television Drama Mini-series – Steve Jodrell

See also
 List of Australian television series

External links 
 
The Circuit at Australian Screen Online

References

Australian drama television series
Special Broadcasting Service original programming
Television shows set in Western Australia
2007 Australian television series debuts
2010 Australian television series endings
Indigenous Australian television series